Nationality words link to articles with information on the nation's poetry or literature (for instance, Irish or France).

-- From William Shippen's, Faction Display'd, the work of a Tory poet on the powerful Whig publisher Jacob Tonson (Bibliopolo, or "book-seller") whose series of anthologies, known as Dryden's Miscellanies or Tonson's Miscellanies used the work of poets paid at low rates to create profitable income for Tonson and, sometimes, recognition and fame for the poets. Shippen incorporated three lines (in italics) written about Tonson by John Dryden, one of the most prominent of Tonson's low-paid poets.

Works published

 Joseph Addison, The Campaign, published this year, although dated "1705"
 Edmund Arwaker, An Embassy from Heav'n; or, The Ghost of Queen Mary
 Daniel Defoe:
 The Address
 An Elegy on the Author of the True-Born English-man
 A Hymn to Victory
 John Dennis, The Grounds of Criticism in Poetry, (criticism in prose)
 Bernard Mandeville, Typhon; or, The Wars Between the Gods and Giants
 Mary Pix, Violenta; or, The Rewards of Virtue, published anonymously; based on the eighth tale of the second day of Boccaccio's Decameron
 Matthew Prior, A letter to Monsieur Boileau Depreaux, published anonymously; about the Battle of Blenheim (August 13, 1704), and satirizing Boileau's Fourth Epistle to the King of France, 1672
 William Wycherley, Miscellany Poems

Births
Death years link to the corresponding "[year] in poetry" article:
 January 1 – Soame Jenyns (died 1787), English writer and poet
 February 13 – Robert Dodsley (died 1764), English bookseller, poet, dramatist and anthologist
 April 30 – Jean Adam (died 1765), Scottish poet
 August 11 – James Miller (died 1744), English playwright, librettist, poet, satirist and clergyman
 December 17 (bapt.) – Moses Browne (died 1787), English poet and clergyman
 Also:
 John Adams (died 1740), English Colonial American clergyman and poet
 William Dawson (died 1752), English Colonial American clergyman, college president and poet
 William Hamilton (died 1754), Scottish Jacobite poet

Deaths
Birth years link to the corresponding "[year] in poetry" article:
 March 29 – Naitō Jōsō (born 1662), Japanese Genroku period haiku poet, a principal disciple of Bashō
 July 24 – István Gyöngyösi (born 1620), Hungarian poet
 September 7 – Benedetto Menzini (born 1646), Italian Roman Catholic priest and poet

See also

Poetry
List of years in poetry
List of years in literature
 18th century in poetry
 18th century in literature

Notes

 "A Timeline of English Poetry" Web page of the Representative Poetry Online Web site, University of Toronto

18th-century poetry
Poetry